Flags of the World (abbreviated FOTW or FotW) is an Internet-based vexillological association and resource. Its principal project is the Internet's largest website devoted to vexillology, containing comprehensive information about various flags, and an associated mailing list. The mailing list began as a discussion group in about September 1993, while the website was founded by Giuseppe Bottasini in late 1994, and Rob Raeside took over as director in 1998. Flags of the World became the 56th member of the FIAV in 2001.

Flags of the World describes itself as "...an Internet group, the sole purpose of which is the advancement of the pursuit of vexillology, that is the creation and development of a body of knowledge about flags and flag usage of all types".

Both the website and the mailing list operate in the English language, though there are members from around the world and as such information from many languages is translated and included. The mailing list is monitored by the FOTW Listmaster, while work on the website is coordinated by the FOTW Editorial Director.

Website 
An editorial staff of 21 unpaid volunteers manages and edits the FOTW website, which (as of 2013) contains more than 81,000 pages about flags and more than 179,000 images of flags, and also includes an extensive online dictionary of vexillology.

The website is updated once a week with fresh material. Due to the high amount of material there is an editing backlog, causing some areas of FOTW to contain outdated information.

Disclaimer 
By its own admission, the quality of the information published on the website varies greatly: it contains not only well-known and official flags, but also drawings and contributions based only on rumors, which are documented accordingly. The published contributions are explicitly declared as private opinions. FOTW declines any responsibility for the truthfulness and accuracy of the published information.

Mailing list 
The source for material on the FOTW website are contributions to the FOTW mailing list, which has over 1,000 members, of which some 100 are active contributors. The mailing list has notable minorities of Portuguese, French, Dutch, and Russian speakers. A staff of three unpaid volunteers manages and moderates the list.

Content 
The FOTW website features sections on flags of different countries such as North Macedonia, which contains subsections about the proposed flags for the country, including documentation of the proposals made by The Flag Institute. Another documentation made by the website is about the Moroccan flag, which contains information about the symbols that were used by Morocco since the Almoravid dynasty. In 2016, the website had more than 9800 pages on flags with an estimated 18000 images.

Graphical conventions 

FOTW displays standardized flag images in GIF format, usually at a height of 216 pixels. While the GIF file format is capable of displaying 256 colours, the site's standard calls for a more restricted "FOTW palette" of 32 colours.

Flag 
The organization's flag is a design by Mark Sensen, which was selected over 10 challengers in a poll of FOTW mailing list members and was adopted 8 March 1996. Since then, March 8 has been regarded as FOTW's Flag Day. Sensen described its symbolism:

The flag is thus used as a rare representation of the Internet on a flag.

Gallery of FOTW flags

References

External links 

 

Online databases
International Federation of Vexillological Associations
Internet properties established in 1993
Internet resources on heraldry